The Mexican mole lizard (Bipes biporus), also commonly known as the five-toed worm lizard, or simply as Bipes, is a species of amphisbaenian in the family Bipedidae. The species is endemic to the Baja California Peninsula. It is one of four species of amphisbaenians that have legs.

Description
It lives for one to two years. Its skin is closely segmented to give a corrugated appearance, and like earthworms, its underground movement is by peristalsis of the segments. Its blunt head allows it to burrow into sandy soils efficiently. The forelegs are short, strong and paddle-like, while the hind legs have disappeared, leaving behind only vestigial bones visible in X-rays. The tail is autotomous without any regeneration. Due to sacrificing the development of its ear to permit it to dig more efficiently, the Mexican mole lizard has evolved to have its skin transmit vibrations to the cochlea.

Reproduction
B. biporus is oviparous, and the females lay one to four eggs in midsummer. The species only breeds underground. The eggs hatch after two months.

Geographic range
The Mexican mole lizard (B. biporus) is found in the states of Baja California, Baja California Sur, Guerrero and Chiapas, in Mexico.

Behavior
Like all other amphisbaenians, B. biporus is a burrowing species that only surfaces at night or after heavy rain. It uses its autotomous tail as an escape tactic for predators. Losing a part of the tail while burrowing can plug up the hole behind it, giving it time to escape.

Diet
B. biporus is an opportunist carnivore and eats ants, termites, ground-dwelling insects, larvae, earthworms, and small animals including lizards. It usually pulls its prey underground to start its meal. The species is a generalist predator that feeds on easily accessible prey found in soil, debris, and dirt. Stomach content analyses showed that most prey items were soft-bodied and bore toothmarks, indicating that the lizard bit and chewed them rather than swallowing them whole.

References

Further reading
Cope ED (1894). "On the Genera and Species of Euchirotidæ". American Naturalist 28: 436-437. (Euchirotes biporus, new species).
Stebbins RC (2003). A Field Guide to Western Reptiles and Amphibians, Third Edition. The Peterson Field Guide Series ®. Boston and New York: Houghton Mifflin. xiii + 533 pp.  (paperback). (Bipes biporus, pp. 428–429 + Plate 55 + Map 200.)

External links
ADW: Bipes biporus: Classification.
Photos and videos of Bipes biporus.

Mexican mole lizard
Animals with only two limbs
Reptiles of Mexico
Fauna of the Baja California Peninsula
Mexican mole lizard
Mexican mole lizard